The FIBA EuroBasket Division C was the third-ranked tier (lowest) of the bi-annual FIBA EuroBasket competition. The winner of this tournament was Denmark.

Group phase

Group A

Group B

Final round

Qualifying round

Final standings

External links 
 Results from FIBA Europe website

2010
2010–11 in European basketball
International basketball competitions hosted by Malta
2010 in Maltese sport